Sandra Carolina Luesse (born June 16, 1982) is an American actress with a Peruvian and German background. Luesse got her start in 2007 when she was cast as the lead girl in the Latin Rock sensation, MANA, Manda una Señal music video which shot to #1 position of the Billboard Hot Latin Tracks chart.

Early life
Luesse was born in West Berlin, to her German father Dr. Karl-Heinz Luesse and to her Peruvian mother Lucilla Carolina Escudero. Luesse moved to the United States when she was 7 years old. Her first stop was Atlanta followed by Chicago and then San Diego. In 2006, Luesse moved to Los Angeles to pursue her acting career. She started in music videos, commercials and then TV and Film.

Career
Luesse got her start in 2007 when she was cast as the lead girl in the Latin Rock sensation, Maná, Manda una Señal music video which shot to #1 position of the Billboard Hot Latin Tracks chart. Shortly after she landed the role of Lisa in Co-Ed Confidential, a pornographic series remake of National Lampoon’s Animal House. In 2011, Luesse won best female breakthrough action star for her role as Gina Cassidy in Cartel War. You can also see Luesse acting alongside Jon Voight and Dermot Mulroney in the supernatural thriller, Beyond. Luesse has guest starred on The Young and the Restless and co-starred opposite Tony Shalhoub and Steve Zhan on Monk. She can also be seen on “Friends with Benefits”  and “Jimmy Kimmel”.

Luesse is also recognized as an international DJ where she has spun for brands around the world including Le Diner en Blanc, Nikki Beach, French Tuesdays, House of Blues, Soho House, and many high-profile events including her residency at 1912 inside the acclaimed Beverly Hills Hotel. While DJing at a Grammy Entertainment basketball league, Luesse was offered her own 13 episode show called “The Lady Splash Show’ on TradioV.  Soon after, she became a co-host for Epic EDM and Techno Buffalo.

Filmography

References

External links

 
 

1982 births
Living people
American actresses
21st-century American women